Plagiotremus azaleus, the sabertooth blenny, is a species of combtooth blenny found in coral reefs in the eastern Pacific Ocean.  This species reaches a length of  TL.

References

External links
 

azaleus
Fish described in 1890
Taxa named by David Starr Jordan
Taxa named by Charles Harvey Bollman